The 2014 Arab Clubs Champions Championship was the 32nd edition of Arab world's premier club volleyball tournament held in Tunis and Sidi Bou Said.

Group stage
The draw was held on 13 February 2014.

Pool A

|}

|}

Pool B

|}

|}

Pool C

|}

|}

Pool D

|}

|}

Knockout stage

Quarterfinals

|}

Semifinals

|}

Bronze medal match

|}

Final

|}

Final standing

Awards
Best Scorer:  Rafael Raidel (Ittihad Misrata)
Best Spiker:  Hichem Kaabi (Espérance de Tunis)
Best Blocker:  Ilouoni Exo (Darkulaib Club)
Best Server:  Jhonlenn Barreto (Zahra Club)
Best Setter:  Mehdi Ben Cheikh (Espérance de Tunis)
Best Receiver:  Ali Mohammed (Darkulaib Club)
Best Libero:  Saddem Hmissi (Espérance de Tunis)
<small>Source: alwasat news, 23.02.2014

References

  Results of the Arab Volleyball Clubs Champions 2014 (Espérance de Tunis official website)
  Photos and Statistics (Arab Volleyball Association)

External links
 Official Arab Volleyball Association website

Arab Clubs Championship (volleyball)
2014 Arab Volleyball Clubs Champions Championship
Arab Volleyball Clubs Champions Championship